Rheingau-Taunus – Limburg is an electoral constituency (German: Wahlkreis) represented in the Bundestag. It elects one member via first-past-the-post voting. Under the current constituency numbering system, it is designated as constituency 178. It is located in southwestern Hesse, comprising the Rheingau-Taunus-Kreis district and the southwestern part of the Limburg-Weilburg district.

Rheingau-Taunus – Limburg was created for the inaugural 1949 federal election. Since 1998, it has been represented by Klaus-Peter Willsch of the Christian Democratic Union (CDU).

Geography
Rheingau-Taunus – Limburg is located in southwestern Hesse. As of the 2021 federal election, it comprises the entirety of the Rheingau-Taunus-Kreis district as well as the Limburg-Weilburg district excluding the municipalities of Beselich, Löhnberg, Mengerskirchen, Merenberg, Runkel, Villmar, Weilburg, Weilmünster, and Weinbach.

History
Rheingau-Taunus – Limburg was created in 1949, then known as Limburg. It acquired its current name in the 1980 election. In the 1949 election, it was Hesse constituency 12 in the numbering system. From 1953 through 1976, it was number 137. From 1980 through 1998, it was number 135. In the 2002 and 2005 elections, it was number 179. Since the 2009 election, it has been number 178.

Originally, the constituency comprised the districts of Rheingaukreis, Untertaunuskreis, and Limburg. It acquired its current borders in the 1976 election.

Members
The constituency has been held continuously by the Christian Democratic Union (CDU) since its creation. It was first represented by Josef Arndgen from 1949 to 1965. He was succeeded by Benno Erhard from 1965 to 1987. Michael Jung then served from 1987 to 1998. Klaus-Peter Willsch was elected in 1998, and re-elected in 2002, 2005, 2009, 2013, 2017, and 2021.

Election results

2021 election

2017 election

2013 election

2009 election

References

Federal electoral districts in Hesse
1949 establishments in West Germany
Constituencies established in 1949
Rheingau-Taunus-Kreis
Limburg-Weilburg